Hilda Ordóñez Andrade (born 21 September 1973) is a female Bolivian football manager.

Coaching career 
Ordóñez started her coaching career 2008 with the Cruceña Football Association. On 9 December 2013, she was appointed as manager of Liga de Fútbol Profesional Boliviano club Sport Boys Warnes. She was the first and only Bolivian female manager in the men's league. Ordóñez gained only a draw and won a single point with the club before she resigned as coach. The club named the former Argentine player Néstor Clausen as a replacement for Ordoñez on 27 December 2013.

Personal life 
She worked for the job as Head coach of Sport Boys Warnes as teacher for Physics on the Warnes, Santa Cruz de la Sierra based colegio Walter Asillas Bernal de Warnes. Ordóñez returned to the job as teacher after her release by Sport Boys Warnes.

References 

1973 births
Living people
Bolivian educators
Bolivian football managers
Bolivian women physicians
Female association football managers
People from Ignacio Warnes Province
Sport Boys Warnes managers